The Nāgarī script or Northern Nagari of Kashi is the ancestor of Devanagari, Nandinagari and other variants, and was first used to write Prakrit and Sanskrit. The term is sometimes used as a synonym for Devanagari script. It came in vogue during the first millennium CE.

The Nāgarī script has roots in the ancient Brahmi script family. Some of the earliest epigraph evidence attesting to the developing Sanskrit Nāgarī script in ancient India is from the 1st to 4th century CE inscriptions discovered in Gujarat. The Nāgarī script was in regular use by 7th century CE, and had fully evolved into Devanagari and Nandinagari scripts by about the end of first millennium of the common era.

Etymology
Nagari comes from नगर, which means city.

Origins
The Nāgarī script appeared in ancient India as a central-eastern variant of the Gupta script (whereas Śāradā was the western variety and Siddham was the far eastern variety). In turn it branched off into several scripts, such as Devanagari and Nandinagari.

Usage outside India
The 7th century Tibetan king Songtsen Gampo ordered that all foreign books be transcribed into the Tibetan language, and sent his ambassador Tonmi Sambota to India to acquire alphabetic and writing methods, who returned with a Sanskrit Nāgarī script from Kashmir corresponding to twenty-four (24) Tibetan sounds and innovating new symbols for six (6) local sounds.

The museum in Mrauk-u (Mrohaung) in the Rakhine state of Myanmar held in 1972 two examples of Nāgarī script. Archaeologist Aung Thaw describes these inscriptions, associated with the Chandra, or Candra, dynasty that first hailed from the ancient Indian city of Vesáli:

See also
Brahmi script
Brahmic scripts
Devanagari
Nandinagari
Sylheti Nagri
Eastern Nagari
Lipi

References

Brahmic scripts